The 1999 Copa América final stages were the elimination stages of the Copa América, following the group stage. They began on 10 July 1999, and consisted of the quarterfinals, the semifinals, the third-place match, and the final held at the Estadio Defensores del Chaco on 18 July in Asunción. No extra time was played if any match in the final stages finished tied after regulation and tied matched went straight to a penalty shootout.

Qualified teams

Bracket

Quarterfinals

Peru v Mexico

Paraguay v Uruguay

Colombia v Chile

Brazil v Argentina

Semifinals

Uruguay v Chile

Mexico v Brazil

Third-place match

Final

References

External links
Copa América 1999 Official Site

Final stages
Final stages
final
1999–2000 in Mexican football
final
final
1999 in Colombian football
1999 in Paraguayan football
1999 in Peruvian football
July 1999 sports events in South America